Jack Morgan Blatherwick (born 4 June 1998) is an English cricketer. He made his List A debut for Nottinghamshire in the 2018 Royal London One-Day Cup on 27 May 2018. He made his first-class debut on 16 September 2019, for Nottinghamshire in the 2019 County Championship.

Personal life
His uncle is the former Nottingham Forest, Burnley and Chesterfield footballer Steve Blatherwick.

References

External links
 

1998 births
Living people
English cricketers
Nottinghamshire cricketers
Cricketers from Nottingham
English cricketers of the 21st century
Lancashire cricketers